Paplitz is a village, part of the town of Baruth/Mark and a former municipality in the Teltow-Fläming district, in Brandenburg, Germany. It is situated in the Glogau-Baruther Urstromtal at the border of the Fläming Heath, 3 km west of Baruth and 53 km south of Berlin.

History
Paplitz, like most places in Brandenburg, was originally a Slavic settlement. It was first mentioned in a charter of the Bishopric of Brandenburg in 1363. Its name may derive from the Wendish term Popelicz meaning poplar grove.

Since 31 December 2001, Paplitz is part of the town of Baruth.

External links 

  
 Paplitz at the Official website of Baruth/Mark

References 

Villages in Brandenburg
Localities in Teltow-Fläming
Teltow-Fläming